Sean Lewis (born April 17, 1992) is an American soccer player who plays as goalkeeper for USL League One club One Knoxville.

Career

Club
In January 2015 Lewis signed for Olympia Warriors of the National Premier League in Australia where he led Olympia to a National Premier League top four finish, Victory League Championship, Summer Cup Championship, and a Victory League Cup Championship . In February 2016, Lewis signed for Jacksonville Armada FC in the NASL.

After two seasons with Penn FC, Lewis joined USL side Tulsa Roughnecks ahead of their 2019 season.

In July 2022, Lewis was traded to Indy Eleven in exchange for defender Noah Powder. He left Indy Eleven following their 2022 season.

Lewis signed with USL League One expansion club One Knoxville on January 24, 2023.

References

External links
Armada Profile

1992 births
Living people
American soccer players
Western Michigan Broncos men's soccer players
Oakland Golden Grizzlies men's soccer players
Panama City Beach Pirates players
Jacksonville Armada FC players
Penn FC players
FC Tulsa players
Indy Eleven players
North American Soccer League players
Association football goalkeepers
People from Rockford, Michigan
Soccer players from Michigan
American expatriate sportspeople in Australia
American expatriate soccer players
Expatriate soccer players in Australia
USL Championship players
One Knoxville SC players